James Hugh Bowman is an Australian thoroughbred racing jockey. Based in Sydney, Bowman has won the New South Wales Metropolitan Jockey Premiership four times (2008/09, 2011/12, 2014/15, 2016/17) and has ridden 100 Group 1 winners. He was the jockey for Australian champion mare Winx from 2014 through to her retirement in 2019. In 2017, Bowman won the Longines World’s Best Jockey award presented by the International Federation of Horseracing Authorities. The award capped off a year in which he added to his domestic success with international Group 1 wins in Hong Kong and Japan. In 2019, he was inducted into the Australian Racing Hall of Fame, the industry’s highest accolade. Bowman is also renowned for his “She’s Apples” winning salute and his nickname of “the Undisputed Group 1 King”.

Early life 
James Hugh Bowman was born on 14 July 1980 in Dunedoo, NSW. His family spent time on three different properties when he was a child – Cairn Hill, Burrgoen, before his parents decided to return to the family farm, Merotherie, in 1993. The same year, Bowman left to commence his secondary schooling, boarding at The Scots College in Sydney’s Eastern Suburbs. Growing up on cattle and sheep properties, Bowman has stated that horses were always an integral part of the working farm and a connection with them was formed early in his life. Bowman also comes from a lineage of horsemen. His grandfather, great uncle, father and uncle all rode as amateur jockeys. Bowman himself was a member of the local pony club until he was 15, riding in country shows and displaying natural horsemanship. He also grew up playing polocrosse, campdrafting and riding in picnic races. Bowman recalls being 13 when he decided that he wanted to pursue a career as a professional jockey. In 1997, he left school and secured an apprenticeship with trainer Leanne Aspros in Bathurst, where he was also mentored by her husband, Billy Aspros, who was 12-time champion jockey in the NSW Central Districts and a Group 1 winner (Turridu, 1995 George Main Stakes).

Career 
On 3 April 1996, Bowman had his first official ride as an amateur jockey at the Mungery Picnic Races in Narromine, NSW aboard Go Campese. Later that year on October 5, he rode his first winner at Wellington, NSW when he guided Slatts to win the Wellington Picnic Cup. By the end of his first apprentice season in 1998, Bowman was the champion apprentice jockey in the NSW Central Districts. In 1999, Bowman moved to Sydney for the final two years of his apprenticeship under the tutelage of jockey-turned-trainer Ron Quinton, who also hailed from Dunedoo. He was crowned champion apprentice in Sydney for the 1999/2000 season. In the spring of 2001, Bowman won his maiden group race when he rode Sportsbrat to victory in the Group 3 Missile Stakes at Rosehill Gardens. His first Group 1 win came on Defier in the 2004 Doomben Cup in Brisbane. The following year, Bowman finished runner-up to Darren Beadman in the 2004/05 NSW Metropolitan Jockey Premiership (colloquially known as the Sydney Jockeys Premiership), the highest award for NSW-based jockeys. He then claimed his first premiership in the 2008/09 season riding 98 winners from 482 starts at a strike rate of 20.3%. Bowman has since won three more titles in 2011/12, 2014/15 and 2016/17. As his career entered the 2010s, Bowman developed a strong association with trainer Chris Waller. He would go on to ride many feature race victories on Waller's horses, most notably Winx. During his career, Bowman has ridden:

 Exceed and Excel: 2003/04 Australian Champion Sprinter
 Samantha Miss: 2008/09 Australian Champion Three-Year-Old Filly
 Werther: 2015/16 Hong Kong Horse of the Year
 Cheval Grand: 2017 Japan Cup Winner
 Winx: 4-time Australian Champion Racehorse of the Year (2015/16 - 2018/19), World's Top-Ranked Turf Horse (2016, 2017), World's Best Racehorse (2018 - tied)

On 5 March 2022, Bowman rode his 100th Group One winner when guiding Forbidden Love to win the Canterbury Stakes at Randwick.

Winx

2014 
Winx had five different jockeys across her first 11 starts in 2014 and 2015, including Bowman. His involvement with Winx began during the Sydney Spring Racing Carnival in 2014. Bowman’s first ride on Winx came at her third career start, on September 6, in the Group 2 Furious Stakes at Royal Randwick. Winx won the race, making it 3 wins from 3 starts, while also registering her first feature race success. Two starts later, on October 4, Bowman would ride Winx to a second-place finish in the Group 1 Flight Stakes at Royal Randwick behind First Seal.

2015 
Bowman did not ride Winx again until her twelfth career start during the Brisbane Winter Racing Carnival – a victory in the Group 1 Queensland Oaks at Doomben Racecourse on May 30. This was Winx's first Group 1 success and the second triumph in what was to become her 33 consecutive race winning streak. Two starts later, after a 15-week spell and a return win in the Group 2 Theo Marks Stakes at Rosehill Gardens, Bowman was back aboard Winx steering the mare to victory in the Group 1 Epsom Handicap at Royal Randwick on October 3. From this race on, Bowman became the permanent jockey for Winx. He would have one more ride on the mare in 2015 when he travelled to Moonee Valley, Melbourne to ride her in the $3 million-dollar Group 1 W. S. Cox Plate – the weight-for-age championship of Australia. Starting as the $4.60 favourite, Winx and Bowman went on to win the race by 4&¾ lengths from Criterion and Irish galloper Highland Reel. The race was won in a record time of 2:02.98.

2016 
Bowman guided Winx to victory in her return to racing on February 13 in the Group 2 Apollo Stakes at Royal Randwick. He would then pilot Winx to three consecutive Group 1 wins over the course of the Sydney Autumn Racing Carnival – the Chipping Norton Stakes, George Ryder Stakes and the $3 million-dollar Doncaster Mile. After a 20-week spell, Winx returned in the spring on August 20 with Bowman steering her to victory in the Group 2 Warwick Stakes at Royal Randwick. Then one month later, just as in the autumn, Bowman would ride Winx to three consecutive Group 1 victories over the course of five weeks. Wins in the George Main Stakes and Caulfield Stakes culminated in Winx and Bowman winning their second W. S. Cox Plate in a row. The race was won by a record margin of 8 lengths. Bowman became only the tenth jockey to win the race back-to-back, while Winx became the tenth horse in history to win two successive Cox Plates.

2017 
Bowman and Winx started off their 2017 autumn campaign in the exact same fashion as 2016 with a win in the Apollo Stakes at Royal Randwick on February 13. Wins in the Chipping Norton Stakes at Randwick and George Ryder Stakes at Rosehill followed on February 25 and March 18 respectively. While Winx and Bowman’s lead-up had been identical to the autumn of 2016, their end goal had shifted to the $4 million-dollar Group 1 Queen Elizabeth Stakes. The race is the premier weight-for-age race of the Sydney Autumn Carnival and the showpiece event of The Championships – a two-day race meeting comprising the most lucrative races of the carnival, attracting horses from around the globe. Starting as the $1.12 short-priced favourite, Bowman guided Winx to a 5-length victory ahead of Hartnell and Sense of Occasion.

The duo returned in the spring registering three wins in Sydney at Royal Randwick – in the Warwick Stakes, Chelmsford Stakes and George Main Stakes – before heading to Melbourne to attempt to win a third consecutive W. S. Cox Plate. On October 7, Bowman and Winx won the Group 1 Turnbull Stakes in her first career start at Flemington Racecourse. Three weeks later, on October 28, Bowman piloted Winx to her third W. S. Cox Plate win, breaking her previous race record set in 2015 with 2:02.94. Winx became only the second horse in history to win three straight Cox Plates after Kingston Town did it in 1980, ‘81 and ’82. Likewise, Bowman was also only the second jockey to win three successive Cox Plates after Brent Thomson managed the feat from 1977-79 on three separate thoroughbreds – Family of Man (’77), So Called (’78) and Dulcify (’79).

2018 
Winx would only race three times in the Sydney Autumn Carnival of 2018, all at Group 1 level. Bowman would ride her to success in her third consecutive Chipping Norton and George Ryder Stakes before she once again won the Queen Elizabeth Stakes for a second straight year. Winx and Bowman returned in the spring on August 18 when they won the newly named and upgraded Group 1 Winx Stakes – formerly the Group 2 Warwick Stakes, renamed in the mare’s honour. Winx became only the second horse in Australian racing history to win a race named in its honour after Black Caviar won the Black Caviar Lightning Stakes in 2013. Victories followed in the George Main Stakes and Turnbull Stakes, before Bowman and Winx won their fourth consecutive W. S. Cox Plate together on October 27. The duo were the first respective horse and jockey to win four successive Cox Plates.

2019 
Winx and Bowman returned to racing, in what would be the mare’s final campaign, on February 16 with victory in the Apollo Stakes at Royal Randwick. Fourth successive Chipping Norton and George Ryder Stakes wins followed on March 2 and March 23 respectively. In their final race together, Bowman and Winx won their third consecutive Queen Elizabeth Stakes. Winx was officially retired after the race. Bowman and Winx’s partnership had produced 29 straight victories and 32 wins and 1 second placing from 33 starts together.

International Success 
Bowman’s first international feature race success came in July 2007 when he won the Group 2 Superlative Stakes aboard Hatta Fort at Newmarket Racecourse in Newmarket, England. Bowman was in England as part of a three-month riding stint with trainer Mick Channon who was based at West Ilsley in Berkshire. In August, Bowman, as part of the “Rest of the World” team, won the Shergar Cup at Ascot Racecourse – a four-team competition where three jockeys represent their region with the winning team determined by their overall performance across six races. The four teams represented were Great Britain, Ireland, Europe and Rest of the World. In addition to winning the Shergar Cup, Bowman also received the Alistair Haggis Silver Saddle, the award given to the individual jockey who has accrued the most points in the competition.

Bowman’s most successful year of international racing came in 2017. After securing his first two international Group 1 wins in 2016 aboard Werther in both the Hong Kong Derby (HK) and Queen Elizabeth II Cup (HK), Bowman would go on to win another four Group 1’s in 2017. Two of these victories were again on Werther in the Hong Kong Gold Cup (HK) and the Hong Kong Champions & Chater Cup (HK). Bowman won another Group 1 in Hong Kong when he rode Lucky Bubbles to success in the Chairman’s Sprint Prize (HK). His fourth win of the year came when he guided Cheval Grand to win the US$5.8 million-dollar Japan Cup (JP), the country’s most prominent race. As a result, Bowman won the 2017 Longines World’s Best Jockey award presented by the International Federation of Horseracing Authorities (IFHA) – the highest achievement for professional jockeys globally. The scoring for the award is based upon performances in the 100-highest rated Group 1 races internationally for that year, as established by the Longines World’s Best Racehorse Rankings Committee. Jockey’s accrue 12 points for first, 6 points for second and 4 points for third. Bowman’s four international Group 1’s, combined with Winx’s six Australian Group 1’s that year, provided 10 wins, along with 3 second placings and 1 third placing, giving him a total of 142 points. Ryan Moore and Frankie Dettori finished second and third with 124 and 86 points respectively. Moore notched 5 wins and Dettori finished with 6.

International Group 1 Wins 

 2016 - Queen Elizabeth II Cup: 2000m, Sha Tin, Hong Kong – Werther
 2017 - Hong Kong Gold Cup: 2000m, Sha Tin, Hong Kong – Werther
 2017 - Chairman’s Sprint Prize: 1200m, Sha Tin, Hong Kong – Lucky Bubbles
 2017 - Hong Kong Champions & Chater Cup: 2400m, Sha Tin, Hong Kong – Werther
 2017 - Japan Cup: 2400m, Tokyo, Japan – Cheval Grand

International Group Race Wins 

 2007 - G2 Superlative Stakes: 1400m, Newmarket, England – Hatta Fort
 2015 - G2 Hopeful Stakes: 2000m, Nakayama, Japan – Hartley
 2016 - G2 Jockey Club Sprint: 1200m, Sha Tin, Hong Kong – Not Listenin’tome
 2017 - G2 Westbury Classic: 1400m, Ellerslie, New Zealand – Thee Auld Floozie

Personal life 
Bowman is married to Christine (née Walsh) and they have two daughters – Bambi and Paige. Christine Bowman is an Irish national who met Hugh when she moved to Sydney after spending the Australian spring of 2002 tending to Irish trainer Dermott Weld’s two Melbourne Cup horses – Vinnie Roe and, eventual winner, Media Puzzle. She is a former trackwork rider and on-course producer for TVN's Sydney race meetings. The family currently reside in Coogee in Sydney’s Eastern Suburbs.

Bowman is named after his great uncle, James Hugh Bowman. He was a private in the Australian Army (Unit: 1 Company Australian Army Service Corps) in World War II who was killed in action on 12 February 1942 in Malaya.

Group 1 Wins

References

Australian jockeys
Horse racing in Australia
Australian Racing Hall of Fame
People educated at Scots College (Sydney)
Dunedoo, New South Wales
Sportsmen from New South Wales